Luiz Henrique Vieira (born 4 February 1972), known as Luizinho Vieira, is a Brazilian football manager and former player who played as a midfielder. He is the current manager of Ypiranga-RS.

Career
He joined Japanese J1 League club Gamba Osaka in summer 1999. On August 7, he debuted in J1 against Verdy Kawasaki in 2nd stage. He played all 15 matches as midfielder and scored 6 goals in 2nd stage. He left Gamba end of 1999 season.

Club statistics

References

External links

1972 births
Brazilian footballers
Living people
Association football midfielders
Brazilian football managers
Brazilian expatriate footballers
Expatriate footballers in Japan
Campeonato Brasileiro Série A players
Campeonato Brasileiro Série B players
J1 League players
Saudi Professional League players
Campeonato Brasileiro Série A managers
Campeonato Brasileiro Série B managers
Campeonato Brasileiro Série C managers
Grêmio Esportivo Brasil players
Club Athletico Paranaense players
Shandong Taishan F.C. players
Gamba Osaka players
Santa Cruz Futebol Clube players
Associação Atlética Internacional (Limeira) players
Ittihad FC players
Marília Atlético Clube players
Associação Atlética Ponte Preta players
Clube Atlético Sorocaba players
Clube 15 de Novembro players
ABC Futebol Clube players
Joinville Esporte Clube players
Ceilândia Esporte Clube players
Oeste Futebol Clube players
Campeonato Brasileiro Série D managers
Criciúma Esporte Clube managers
Itumbiara Esporte Clube managers
Luverdense Esporte Clube managers
Club Sportivo Sergipe managers
Volta Redonda Futebol Clube managers
Manaus Futebol Clube managers
Esporte Clube Passo Fundo managers
Ypiranga Futebol Clube managers
Expatriate footballers in Saudi Arabia
Brazilian expatriate sportspeople in Saudi Arabia